The 2026 EHF European Women's Handball Championship, commonly referred to as the EHF EURO 2026, will be the 17th edition of the EHF European Women's Handball Championship and will be held in Russia in December 2026.

Bid process
On 20 November 2021 at the 14th EHF Extraordinary Congress it was announced that the 2026 EHF European Women's Handball Championship will take place in Russia.

Russia's bid was the only one, as the EHF Executive Committee was previously notified that Norway, Denmark and Sweden had withdrawn their joint bid.

Bidding timeline
The bidding timeline is as follows:

 4 June 2020: Invitation to National Federations to provide a letter of intent to the EHF for hosting the EHF EUROs 2026 & 2028
 1 October 2020: Deadline for submitting the letter of intent and request for the bidding documents by the interested federations
 1 November 2020: Dispatch of the manual for staging the EHF EUROs 2026 & 2028 together with the relevant specifications and forms by the EHF
 1 May 2021: Applications available at the EHF Office
 May/June 2021: Evaluation of bids by the EHF
 June 2021: Approval of applications by EHF EXEC
 June–September 2021: Site inspections
 September 2021: Further evaluation after inspections
 September 2021: Confirmation of bids for the EHF EUROs 2026 & 2028
 17/18 November 2021: Allocation at the EO EHF Congress 2021

Bids
On 11 May 2021 it was announced that the following nations sent in an official expression of interest: 
 
 ,  &  Withdrew in October 2021. The Scandinavians bid for 2028.

Host selection 
As only the Russian bid remained it was unanimously selected at the 14th EHF Extraordinary Congress on 20 November 2021.

Venues

Qualification

Qualified teams 

1 Bold indicates champion for that year

References

Weblinks 
 Bid website of the European Handball Federation

European Women's Handball Championship
2026 in European sport
European Championship, Women, 2026
European Women's
Sports competitions in Moscow
Sports competitions in Saint Petersburg